Carey Baker (born March 16, 1963) is an American politician currently serving as the Property Appraiser for Lake County, Florida. He is a former Republican member of the Florida Legislature. Baker served as the State Representative for the 25th District of the Florida House of Representatives from 2000 to 2004 and served as the State Senator for the 20th District of the Florida Senate from 2004 to 2010.

Baker is also the owner of the A.W. Peterson Gun Shop and a retired First Sergeant in the Florida Army National Guard. He was the first state or federal elected official to serve in Operation Iraqi Freedom while also holding elected office.

Early life, education, and personal life
Baker was born and raised in Eustis. He is the son of former State Representative Leighton Baker. Baker's family has owned the A.W. Peterson Gun Shop since 1952. When Baker was 18 years old, he joined the family business and still operates it today. Baker graduated from Tavares High School and attended Lake–Sumter Community College.

Baker resides with his wife, Lori, and their three children in Eustis.

Military service

Baker joined the Florida Army National Guard while still in high school.

In 2003, while a member of the Florida House of Representatives, Baker was deployed to Iraq as part of Operation Iraqi Freedom. Baker served as First Sergeant of Alpha Company, 2nd Battalion, 124th Infantry Regiment, which was assigned to protect a logistic base near Balad. The area, north of Baghdad, is located in the Sunni Triangle, one of the most dangerous areas in Iraq. During his deployment, Baker faced numerous close calls: in one instance, a mortar round hit a bus full of soldiers. The base Baker was stationed at was under constant attack by mortar fire and rocket fire. On his last day of deployment, a missile landed in the camp but did not explode.

He was the first state or federal elected official to serve in Operation Iraqi Freedom while also holding elected office. Baker's colleagues in the House tied a yellow ribbon around his chair on the House floor, which remained in place until he returned. In 2004, the Florida Legislature unanimously passed House Bill 1757, the Carey Baker Freedom Flag Act. This act amended Florida law to require that every classroom in any public K-20 educational institution must display the American flag on a daily basis. The flag must be made in the United States and must be properly displayed in accordance with United States Code. The law mandated that the required flags be displayed in each classroom no later than August 1, 2005.

In 2007, Baker was part of a thirteen-member team of Florida Army National Guardsmen sent to train soldiers from former Soviet Union satellite countries.

During his military career, Baker graduated from numerous military courses and schools, including the U.S. Army Jungle Operation School and the U.S. Army Pathfinder School. He retired in 2013, after serving over thirty-one years and attaining the rank of First Sergeant.

Awards and decorations

Political career

In 2000, a record 83 incumbent state legislators were forced to retire due to term-limits added to the Florida Constitution by 77 percent of the voters in 1992. Included in this group was Representative Stan Bainter of Eustis, causing the House District 25 seat to be open for the first time since 1986. The 25th House District included southwest Marion County, east Lake County, northwest Seminole County and west Volusia County.

Baker ran for the Republican nomination, defeating Betty Hensinger, a Lake County businesswoman, in the primary election. In the November general election, he defeated DeBary Democrat Rick Dwyer, a computer consultant, to secure election to the Florida House of Representatives. Baker was subsequently reelected to the House in 2002 without opposition. While serving in the Florida House of Representatives, Baker served as the Vice Chair of the Juvenile Justice Committee (2001–2002), Co-chair of the Agriculture & Environment Appropriations Sub-Committee (2003–2004) and served on the Fiscal Policy and Resources Committee (2001–2002), Insurance Committee (2001–2002) and the Workforce and Technical Skills Committee (2001–2002).

In 2004, Anna Cowin, the Leesburg Republican who held the 20th District State Senate Seat, announced that she would not seek re-election to her seat and instead would run for Lake County Superintendent of Schools. Baker announced his intention to run for the Senate seat and won the 2004 special election. He was re-elected to full terms in 2006 and 2008. The 20th Senate district includes parts of Marion, Sumter, Lake, Volusia and Seminole counties. While serving in the Florida Senate, he served as Chairman of the Senate Government Operations Committee and on the Senate Transportation Committee, Senate Agriculture Committee, and Senate General Government Appropriation Committee.

In 2012, Baker narrowly defeated long-time incumbent Ed Havill for the position of Property Appraiser of Lake County, Florida, and ran unopposed in 2016. In 2014, Baker was elected president of the Florida Association of Property Appraisers.

Legislative activities
In 2003, Baker introduced HB 805, which expanded Florida's private school voucher program to the families of military personnel. As Baker was deployed to Iraq, Frank Attkisson presented the bill on Baker's behalf. The bill passed 74–42.

In 2004, Baker passed legislation designating an eight-mile stretch of State Road 50, from Mascotte to Stuckey, the "Eric Ulysses Ramirez Highway". Ramirez was a 1991 graduate of Mount Dora High School, serving in the National Guard. He was killed on February 12, 2004, in Iraq. He was 31 years old.

In 2006, Baker passed the Justin McWilliams Act into law. The legislation closed a "legal loophole" in the Florida statutes, applying the State Uniform Traffic Rules to private property.

In 2007, Baker filed a bill to established a sales tax holiday, from June 1 through 12, 2007, exempting taxes on hurricane preparedness items. The holiday was expected to save Floridians almost $25 million in 2007 alone.

Baker first introduced legislation to ban texting while driving in 2007. Baker filed the bill after tractor-trailer driver Reinaldo Gonzalez slammed into a school bus while he was on his phone, killing a 13-year-old girl. The legislation died in committee. In 2010, while serving as Chairman of the Senate Transportation Committee, Baker filed SB 324 and SB 326, which would have banned anyone younger than 18 years of age from writing or sending a text message on an electronic communications device while operating a motor vehicle, but it died in committee.

In 2009, Baker was named "Senator of the Year" by the Florida Fraternal Order of Police.

In 2010, Baker introduced SJR 72, the Health Care Freedom Act. The act placed an initiative on the ballot that would have banned any laws requiring people to participate in a health care system. The bill passed the Senate and House and was placed on the ballot as Amendment 9. On July 29, 2010, Leon County Circuit Judge James Shelfer said the measure was misleading and could confuse voters. The Florida Supreme Court upheld the lower court's ruling on August 31, 2010.

Electoral history

See also
Government of Florida
Florida Legislature
Florida Senate
Florida Senate Majority Office
Florida House of Representatives
Republican Party of Florida

References

Living people
1963 births
People from Eustis, Florida
United States Army non-commissioned officers
Military personnel from Florida
Republican Party members of the Florida House of Representatives
Republican Party Florida state senators
20th-century American politicians
21st-century American politicians